Rapoltu Mare is a commune in Hunedoara County, Transylvania, Romania. It is composed of five villages: Bobâlna (Bábolna), Boiu (Boj), Folt (Folt), Rapoltu Mare and Rapolțel (Kisrápolt).

The Hungarian noble family Szent-Györgyi de Nagyrápolt has used the name of this village since the Middle Ages. Its most famous member is the scientist Albert Szent-Györgyi.

Natives
 Atanasie Anghel
 József Somkuthy

References

Communes in Hunedoara County
Localities in Transylvania